Iridomyrmex hartmeyeri is a species of ant in the genus Iridomyrmex. Described by Forel in 1907, the ant is a nocturnal forager, and it distributed in most of Australia.

References

Iridomyrmex
Hymenoptera of Australia
Insects described in 1907